Arthrochilus corinnae, commonly known as the swamp elbow orchid, is a flowering plant in the orchid family (Orchidaceae) and is endemic to the northern part of Cape York in Queensland. It has two or three dull bluish green leaves near its base and up to twelve pale green, insect-like flowers with shiny yellowish glands on its labellum.

Description
Arthrochilus corinnae is a terrestrial, perennial, deciduous, sympodial herb with an underground tuber which produces daughter tubers on the end of root-like stolons. Non-flowering plants have a rosette of leaves, which in flowering plants are on a short side stem.
The petals and lateral sepals turn backwards against the ovary. Flowering occurs from November to February.

Taxonomy and naming
Arthrochilus corinnae was first formally described in 2004 by David Jones from a specimen collected on Cape York. The description was published in The Orchadian.

Distribution and habitat
The swamp elbow orchid grows in low-lying swampy areas with Melaleuca and Pandanus species on the Cape York Peninsula.

Ecology
As with other Arthrochilus orchids, A. corinnae is pollinated by male thynnid wasps of the genus Arthrothynnus although the species involved is not known. It also reproduces asexually by producing new tubers.

References 

corinnae
Plants described in 2004
Orchids of Queensland